Siswanto (born 9 October 1984) is an Indonesian professional footballer who plays as a winger for Liga 3 club PS Siak.

Career 
On 2 December 2014, he signed with Persebaya Surabaya.

Honours

Club
Sriwijaya
 Indonesia Super League: 2011–12

References

External links 
 

1984 births
Living people
Indonesian footballers
People from Pasuruan
Persekabpas Pasuruan players
Persmin Minahasa players
Persib Bandung players
Persema Malang players
Sriwijaya F.C. players
Gresik United players
Persebaya Surabaya players
Liga 1 (Indonesia) players
Association football wingers
Sportspeople from East Java